Graeme Armstrong (born 23 June 1956) is a Scottish retired footballer. He is best known for the longevity of his playing career, which encompassed a Scottish record figure of 910 league appearances over a 26-year period between 1975 and 2001. Including cup matches, Armstrong is one of a select number of players who have amassed over 1,000 career appearances.

Career

Born in Edinburgh, Armstrong began his career in the non-leagues in Scotland, including for Haddington Athletic, playing once as a trialist for Meadowbank Thistle, before being signed by Stirling Albion in 1975, making his league debut on 26 April 1975. Over the next 6 seasons "Louis" played in 204 games for the Yo-Yo's before being transferred to Berwick Rangers and then spending 10 years at Meadowbank Thistle.

He then moved on to Stenhousemuir, where he later broke Tommy Hutchison's British record of 863 league appearances. With Stenny, Armstrong lifted the Scottish Challenge Cup beating Dundee United in the 1995 final. He also played in the Scottish Cup giant-killing against Aberdeen in 1995.

Armstrong later became manager and guided the side to promotion. He was sacked in April 2000, with Stenhousemuir battling relegation. In 2005, Armstrong was voted Stenhousemuir's all-time cult hero by viewers of BBC's Football Focus.

Armstrong joined Alloa Athletic as assistant-manager, also registering as a player, the following day. He played just once for Alloa, as a substitute in April 2001, at the age of 44 years, before retiring. He was dismissed by Alloa in January 2003 as part of a drive to cut costs.

In 2007, he guided Newtongrange to the Scottish Junior Football Association's East Region, South Division championship and promotion to the Premier League. On 8 April, Graeme Armstrong resigned from his post as manager of Junior side Newtongrange Star after 6 years.

Honours 

 PLAYER

Stirling Albion

Scottish Second Division: 1976–77

Meadowbank Thistle

Scottish Second Division: 1986–87

Stenhousemuir

Scottish Challenge Cup: 1995–96
Scottish Third Division: Promoted 1998–99

 MANAGER

Newtongrange Star

SJFA East Region Premier League: Promoted 2008–09
 SJFA East Region South Division: 2006–07
 East Junior League Cup: 2008–09

 East Junior South League Cup: 2008–09

See also
 List of footballers in Scotland by number of league appearances (500+)

References

Living people
1956 births
Footballers from Edinburgh
Scottish footballers
Stirling Albion F.C. players
Berwick Rangers F.C. players
Livingston F.C. players
Stenhousemuir F.C. players
Scottish football managers
Stenhousemuir F.C. managers
Alloa Athletic F.C. players
Scottish Football League players
Scottish Football League managers
Association football defenders
Association football wingers
Scottish Junior Football Association managers
Newtongrange Star F.C. managers